Gunnar H. Haraldsen (born 21 November 1987) is a Faroese former footballer who played as a centre-back or midfielder and made one appearance for the Faroe Islands national team.

Career
Haraldsen earned his first and only cap for the Faroe Islands on 1 March 2014 in a friendly against Gibraltar. He came on as a 85th-minute substitute for Viljormur Davidsen, with the away match at Victoria Stadium finishing as a 4–1 win.

Career statistics

International

References

External links
 
 
 

1987 births
Living people
People from Tórshavn
Faroese footballers
Faroe Islands youth international footballers
Faroe Islands international footballers
Association football central defenders
Association football midfielders
FC Hoyvík players
07 Vestur players
Argja Bóltfelag players
Havnar Bóltfelag players
Faroe Islands Premier League players
1. deild players
2. deild players